The Amba (in Udege Language it means Tiger) is a river in Primorsky Krai, Russia.

It rises in the Borisov Plateau near the border with China and flow into the Amur Bay of the Sea of Japan.

The water level of the Amba may rise as much as  higher after summer rains.

Amba literally means Amur tiger in Nanai and Udege languages.

Notes

Rivers of Primorsky Krai
Drainage basins of the Sea of Japan